Don't Hang Up is a 2016 horror-thriller film written by Joe Johnson and directed by Alexis Wajsbrot and Damien Macé.  The film stars Gregg Sulkin, Garrett Clayton, Bella Dayne, and Sienna Guillory. The film had its world premiere on 4 June 2016 at the Los Angeles Film Festival and was released in theaters in the United States on 10 February 2017.

Plot

Teenage pranksters Brady Mannion, Sam Fuller, Jeff Mosley, and Roy, a.k.a. “PrankMonkey69”, successfully convince Mrs. Kolbein that an intruder is in her house and her daughter is in danger. The video of the prank phone call goes viral and the boys become well known on YouTube.

With Sam alone at home for the weekend, Brady comes over and the two of them make more prank phone calls. One of their pranks involves ordering a pizza for Sam's neighbor Larry. Jeff, who delivers the pizza from the shop where he works with Sam's girlfriend Peyton, becomes upset with his friends for involving him in the prank.

A mysterious man who identifies himself as Mr. Lee begins repeatedly calling the boys, insisting that they do not hang up on him. Sam and Brady are initially indifferent until Mr. Lee reveals that he knows their names, addresses, and intimate details of their lives. Peyton delivers a pizza that Sam and Brady didn't order. Peyton reveals that Jeff disappeared after his earlier delivery. Sam and Peyton have an uncomfortable conversation about their relationship before Peyton leaves. Mr. Lee begins texting Sam and Brady in addition to calling. Video footage he sends them reveals that Mr. Lee is holding Brady's parents hostage at the Mannion residence. Mr. Lee prevents the boys from calling 911 by hijacking their cell phone lines. He also takes control of the house's electrical power. A video feed shows the masked Mr. Lee suffocating Roy to death with a plastic bag tied around his head. Sam finds Jeff similarly bound with a plastic bag and tied to the back door. Jeff dies soon after Sam cuts him loose.

While Sam is away, Mr. Lee makes Brady an offer to kill Sam in exchange for his parents' freedom. Mr. Lee sends footage showing that he captured Peyton. Sam deduces that Brady had a private conversation with Mr. Lee, leading to a fight between the two. Brady is knocked unconscious. Mr. Lee shows Sam live footage of Peyton held prisoner. He promises to let Peyton go if Sam kills Brady. Sam restrains Brady by securing his wrist to the banister with a zip tie to prevent him from leaving. A clue of a child's image and the name Izzy leads Sam to check a previously ignored social media friend request. The Izzy account reveals that Mr. Lee had been stalking the pranksters for over a year. Sam also finds a video revealing that Brady had been sleeping with Peyton. Sam beats Brady again.

Sam notices from a clock in the background that the video of Brady's parents is two hours behind the current time. Sam frees Brady. New video shows that Mr. Lee already killed Brady's parents. Believing that Peyton is probably dead too, the boys plan to escape and contact authorities. However, once Sam is outside, Brady locks the front door and remains behind. Sam finds a surveillance van outside in the rain. Inside the van, Sam finds Peyton and rescues her. Back in the house, Brady steps over Jeff's covered body to go out the back door. In the backyard, Brady finds Jeff's real body. Brady realizes that Mr. Lee switched places with Jeff and hid in the house. Mr. Lee catches Brady off guard and attacks him.

Sam has Peyton go for help while he looks for Brady. Sam follows Peyton's screams to the backyard. A masked man suddenly lunges at Sam and Sam stabs him. The man turns out to be Brady, tied up and gagged to look like Mr. Lee in a mask so that Sam would kill him by mistake. With Sam and Peyton defeated, Mr. Lee shows up and explains his actions. When the four boys previously called Mrs. Kolbein, she dropped her phone and didn't hear the revelation that she had been pranked. Still convinced that there was an intruder in the house, Mrs. Kolbein grabbed a gun and accidentally shot her daughter Izzy. Upon realizing what she had done, Mrs. Kolbein killed herself. It's implied that Mrs. Kolbein and the young girl were Mr. Lee's wife and daughter, and he wanted to avenge their deaths. Mr. Lee knocks Sam unconscious.

When Sam wakes up, he finds Peyton shot in the head. Holding a knife in one hand and a gun in the other, Sam is arrested by the police arriving at the scene; Mr. Lee successfully having framed Sam for killing Peyton and Brady out of jealousy, as well as the other murders.

In the epilogue, Mr. Lee begins targeting a new teen prankster.

Cast
 Gregg Sulkin as Sam Fuller
 Garrett Clayton as Brady Mannion
 Bella Dayne as Peyton Grey

 Sienna Guillory as Mrs. Kolbein

 Edward Killingback as Prank Monkey 69
 Jack Brett Anderson as Jeff Mosley
 Robert Goodman as Larry
 Connie Wilkins as Izzy
 Parker Sawyers as Mr. Lee
 Philip Desmueles as Voice of Mr. Lee

Reception
The review aggregator website Rotten Tomatoes reported a 25% approval rating with an average rating of 3.91/10 based on 16 reviews.

References

External links
 
 

2016 films
2016 horror films
2016 horror thriller films
2010s teen horror films
British horror thriller films
British teen horror films
Films about murderers
British films about revenge
Films set in California
Films shot in London
Prank calling
Films about telephony
Vertical Entertainment films
2010s English-language films
2010s British films